The Coates House is a historic house in Virginia, Minnesota, United States.  It was built around 1912 as one of the city's larger and finer residences.  A succession of prominent people in the local lumber industry lived in it.  The house was listed on the National Register of Historic Places in 1980 for its local significance in the themes of architecture and social history.  It was nominated for demonstrating the class distinctions telegraphed by housing stock on the Iron Range at the turn of the 20th century.  Large houses for the managerial class provided a sharp contrast to the boarding houses and small cottages into which the period's working class population was crowded.

See also
 National Register of Historic Places listings in St. Louis County, Minnesota

References

1912 establishments in Minnesota
Buildings and structures in Virginia, Minnesota
Houses completed in 1912
Houses in St. Louis County, Minnesota
Houses on the National Register of Historic Places in Minnesota
Logging in the United States
National Register of Historic Places in St. Louis County, Minnesota